Ormetica is a genus of moths in the family Erebidae.

Species

Ormetica abdalsan (Schaus, 1920)
Ormetica albimaculifera (Hampson, 1901)
Ormetica ameoides (Butler, 1876)
Ormetica ataenia (Schaus, 1910)
Ormetica bonora (Schaus, 1905)
Ormetica chrysomelas (Walker, 1856)
Ormetica codasi (Jörgensen, 1935)
Ormetica collateralis (Hampson, 1901)
Ormetica contraria (Walker, 1854)
Ormetica flavobasalis (Gaede, 1923)
Ormetica fulgurata (Butler, 1876)
Ormetica gerhilda (Schaus, 1933)
Ormetica goloma (Schaus, 1920)
Ormetica guapisa (Schaus, 1910)
Ormetica iheringi (Schaus, 1921)
Ormetica latania (Druce, 1890)
Ormetica longilinea (Schaus, 1933)
Ormetica maura (Schaus, 1910)
Ormetica melea (Druce, 1900)
Ormetica metallica (Joicey & Talbot, 1916)
Ormetica nabdalsa (Schaus, 1889)
Ormetica neira (Schaus, 1905)
Ormetica ochreomarginata (Joicey & Talbot, 1918)
Ormetica orbona (Schaus, 1889)
Ormetica packardi (Butler, 1876)
Ormetica pallidifascia (Rothschild, 1933)
Ormetica pallidinervis (Rothschild, 1935)
Ormetica pauperis (Schaus, 1910)
Ormetica postradiata (Schaus, 1924)
Ormetica pratti (Druce, 1900)
Ormetica pretiosa (Schaus, 1921)
Ormetica pseudoguapisa (Rothschild, 1910)
Ormetica rosenbergi (Rothschild, 1909)
Ormetica rothschildi Watson, 1975
Ormetica sicilia (Druce, 1884)
Ormetica sphingidea (Perty, 1833)
Ormetica stenotis (Dognin, 1908)
Ormetica sypalettius (Seitz, 1921)
Ormetica sypilus (Cramer, [1777])
Ormetica taeniata (Guérin-Méneville, [1844])
Ormetica taniala (Schaus, 1910)
Ormetica tanialoides (Rothschild, 1910)
Ormetica temperata (Schaus, 1921)
Ormetica triangularis (Gaede, 1928)
Ormetica underwoodi (Rothschild, 1909)
Ormetica valera (Schaus, 1933)
Ormetica xanthia (Hampson, 1901)
Ormetica zenzeroides (Butler, 1877)

References
Natural History Museum Lepidoptera generic names catalog

 
Phaegopterina
Moth genera